Ivo Perović (1882−1958) was Regent of Yugoslavia for the underage Peter II from 1934 to 1941.

1882 births
1958 deaths
Regents
Arbanasi people